The 2018 version of the Syrian Cup is the 48th edition to be played. It is the premier knockout tournament for football teams in Syria. Al-Wahda are the defending champions.

The competition has been disrupted because of the ongoing Syrian Civil War, where some games have been awarded as 3:0 victories due to teams not being able to compete.

The winners of the competition will enter the 2019 AFC Cup.

First round

First leg

Second leg

Final phase

Bracket

Second round

First leg

Second leg

Third round

First leg

Second leg

Quarter-finals

First leg

Second leg

Semi-finals

First leg

Second leg

Final

References

2018
2018 Asian domestic association football cups
Cup